Liolaemus calliston is a species of lizard in the family  Liolaemidae. It is native to Argentina.

References

calliston
Reptiles described in 2017
Reptiles of Argentina
Taxa named by Luciano Javier Ávila
Taxa named by Jack W. Sites Jr.
Taxa named by Mariana Morando